The D12-methyl RNA motif is a conserved RNA structure that was discovered by bioinformatics.
D12-methyl motifs are found in metagenomic DNA samples, and have not yet been found in a classified organism.

It is ambiguous whether D12-methyl RNAs function as cis-regulatory elements or whether they operate in trans.  On the one hand, they are located upstream of protein-coding genes of a variety of types.  This fact could suggest that D12-methyl RNAs function in cis.  However, many of the associated genes are typical of those located in prophages.  Since phage genomes often consist of a small number of large operons, it is possible that the D12-methyl RNAs are simply one of the genetic elements in a long, phage transcriptional unit.

References

Non-coding RNA